Gambia International Airlines Limited (GIA) was the national airline of the Gambia, headquartered in Banjul. It operated mostly regional passenger services within West Africa out of Banjul International Airport, as well as flights to London. The airline was owned by the Government of the Gambia (99%) and Gambia Telecommunications Company (1%).

History
Gambia International Airlines was established on 23 January 1996 and started operations (originally only ground handling) on 1 March of the same year. Even though claiming net profit of 1.3 million dollars in 2003, the airline was forced to suspend its flight operations again in April 2004 due to operational problems. Gambia International Airlines could never re-establish any flight operations, and was finally shut down in 2007.

Destinations
Upon closure, Gambia International Airlines served the following scheduled destinations:
The Gambia
Banjul - Banjul International Airport
Nigeria
Lagos - Murtala Muhammed International Airport
Senegal
Dakar - Léopold Sédar Senghor International Airport
Sierra Leone
Freetown - Lungi International Airport
United Kingdom
London - London Gatwick Airport

Fleet
In 2004, the Gambia International Airlines fleet consisted of the following aircraft:

 1 Boeing 737-200
 1 Boeing 737-800

See also		
 List of defunct airlines of the Gambia
 Transport in the Gambia

References

External links
  via Wayback Machine

Airlines established in 1996
Airlines disestablished in 2007
Defunct airlines of the Gambia
Government-owned airlines